Pleasant Hill School may refer to:

 In Canada
 Pleasant Hill, Saskatoon#Education

 In the United States
 College Park High School (Pleasant Hill, California) — a high school in Mount Diablo Unified School District and in Pleasant Hill, Contra Costa County, California, with "Falcons" as a team name
 Pleasant Hill Elementary School (Pleasant Hill, California) — a grade school in Mount Diablo Unified School District and in Pleasant Hill, Contra Costa County, California
 Pleasant Hill High School (Pleasant Hill, California) — a former high school in Mount Diablo Unified School District and in Pleasant Hill, Contra Costa County, California, with "Rams" as a team name.  Closed in 1980.
 Pleasant Hill Intermediate School (Pleasant Hill, California) — a former intermediate school in Mount Diablo Unified School District and in Pleasant Hill, Contra Costa County, California, with "Trojans" as a team name.  The school was changed to an Academics Plus Program in 1978 and renamed Sequoia Middle School (Pleasant Hill, California). 
 Pleasant Hill Middle School (Pleasant Hill, California) — a middle school in Mount Diablo Unified School District and in Pleasant Hill, Contra Costa County, California, with "Rams" as a team name.  The school is located in the old Pleasant Hill High School campus.
 Pleasant Hill School — previous name of Pleasant Hill Elementary School (Pleasant Hill, California) from 1866 until around 1949.   
 Pleasant Hill School — a grade school in Palatine Community Consolidated School District 15, Palatine, Cook County, Illinois
 Pleasant Hill School District 69 — a single-school elementary district in Peoria County, Illinois
 Pleasant Hill High School (Illinois) — the high school of Pleasant Hill Community Unit School District 3, Pleasant Hill, Pike County, Illinois, with "Wolves" as the team name
 Pleasant Hill School (Lineville, Iowa), listed on the National Register of Historic Places in Wayne County, Iowa.  
 Pleasant Hill High School (Louisiana) — a high school of the Sabine Parish School Board, Sabine Parish, Louisiana, with "Eagles" as a team name
 Any of the schools of Pleasant Hill R-III School District in Pleasant Hill, Missouri
 Pleasant Hill High School (Missouri) — the high school of that district, with "Roosters" and "Chicks" as team names
 Either of the schools of Pleasant Hill School District (Oregon) in Pleasant Hill, Oregon
 Pleasant Hill High School (Oregon) — the high school of that district, with "Billies" as the team name